Nicolae 'Colea' Vâlcov (born 23 February 1909 in Bolgrad, Russian Empire – deceased 31 March 1970) was a Romanian footballer and manager. He played for Venus București.

Vâlcov was part of the famous offensive line of Venus București in the 1930s, together with his brothers, Petea and Volodea. He was arguably the most talented of the three, with a great header (his most feared weapon) and good anticipation in front of the goal.

The three brothers, originally Bulgarians from Moldova, are included in the list of the greatest football players in the history of club football Venus București.

Two of his brothers had final tragics. First, Petea died on the front in 1943 World War II, on the eastern front, fighting the Soviets, And almost over a decade, Volodea left this world due to tuberculosis. Senior Colea was the most longevity. Once after his footballer career, he became a coach for Romania, Steaua București and Dinamo București.

He is the second manager in the history of Steaua București.

Honours
Player

Venus București
National titles: 4
1931–32, 1933–34, 1936–37, 1938–39

Manager

Steaua București
Romanian Cup: 1
1948–49

References

1909 births
1970 deaths
Liga I players
Venus București players
FC Steaua București managers
FC Steaua București assistant managers
FC Dinamo București managers
FC Petrolul Ploiești managers
FC Politehnica Timișoara managers
Romanian football managers
Romania national football team managers
Association football forwards
Romanian footballers
FC Metaloglobus București managers